Post Graduate Government College Co-ed, Sector 11, (PGGC-11) is a constituent college of the Panjab University located in Sector 11, Chandigarh. It is as old as Chandigarh.

History 
The college was started on 26 May 1953 from a building in Sector 10, at present the building houses the famous Hotel Mountview. Later it was shifted to the premises of Government Model Senior Secondary School, Sector 23. Finally, on 13 October 1960, the college was moved to its own building in Sector 11. The college building was originally designed by E Maxwell Fry, an English modernist architect.

Courses 
PGGC-11 is affiliated with Panjab University and presently offers the following courses :
 Bachelor of Arts
 Bachelor of Commerce
 Bachelor of Science
 Bachelor of Physical Education
 Bachelor of Computer Application
 Bachelor of Business Administration

Notable alumni 
 Jimmy Sheirgill
 Sanjay Tandon
 Pawan Kumar Bansal
 Amitabh Bachchan
Joginder Singh

References

Colleges in India
Education in Chandigarh